Better than that may refer to:

Better Than That (campaign), a UK anti-hate crime campaign launched in 2016
"Better Than That", a 2011 song by Status Quo from the album Quid Pro Quo
"Better Than That" (song), a 2013 single by Miles Kane
"Better Than That", a 2015 song by Marina and the Diamonds from the album Froot
"Better Than That", a 2018 song by James from the album Living in Extraordinary Times